Damien Cook (born 23 June 1991) is an Australian professional rugby league footballer who plays as a  for the South Sydney Rabbitohs in the NRL and Australia at international level.

He previously played for the St. George Illawarra Dragons and the Canterbury-Bankstown Bulldogs in the National Rugby League, and at representative level for Country NSW and New South Wales in the State of Origin series.

Background
Cook was born in Sutherland, New South Wales, Australia. He was educated at Endeavour Sports High School. He is the nephew of former rugby league player Peter Phillips.

Cook grew up in his home town of Helensburgh, New South Wales, in the Illawarra region of Australia. He was a state champion in the NSW Surf Life Saving Championships throughout his youth.

He played his junior rugby league for the Helensburgh Tigers, before being signed by the Penrith Panthers.

Playing career
In 2010 and 2011, Cook played for the Penrith Panthers' NYC team. In 2012, he joined the Illawarra Cutters in the New South Wales Cup. On 30 October 2012, he signed a one-year contract with the St. George Illawarra Dragons starting in 2013.

2013
In round 6 of the 2013 NRL season, Cook made his NRL debut for St. George against the Wests Tigers. On 22 September, he was named on the interchange bench in the 2013 New South Wales Cup Team of the Year. On 6 November, he signed a two-year contract with the Canterbury-Bankstown Bulldogs starting in 2014.

2014
In round 14 of the 2014 NRL season, Cook made his Canterbury-Bankstown debut against the Parramatta Eels.

2015
On 31 January and 1 February, Cook played for Canterbury in the 2015 NRL Auckland Nines.

On 27 September , Cook was named on the interchange bench in the 2015 New South Wales Cup Team of the Year, for a second year. On 15 October, Cook signed a 2-year contract with the South Sydney Rabbitohs starting in 2016.  Cook played a total of 37 reserve grade games for Canterbury and scored two tries.

2016
On 1 February Cook was named in South Sydney's 2016 NRL Auckland Nines squad.

On 6 March 2016, Cook made his debut for Souths against the Sydney Roosters and scored a try in Souths 42-10 win.  Cook went on to play a further 17 times for the 2016 NRL season.  Cook also featured for Norths in The NSW Cup making two appearances.

2017
Cook was named in South Sydney's squad for the 2017 NRL Auckland Nines.

On 1 May 2017, Cook was named in The NSW Country Origin representative team to play against The NSW City representative side in the last ever City vs Country game.

2018
Cook started the 2018 NRL season as the first choice hooker for Souths over Robbie Farah. This year was Cook's most successful year. He made his debut for NSW in state of origin and the Australian Kangaroos.   On 28 May 2018, Cook was selected to play for NSW against Queensland in the 2018 State of Origin series after a number of good performances at club level.  Cook played in all 3 games for New South Wales as they won their first origin series since 2014.
Cook was part of the Souths side which finished 3rd on the table at the end of the regular season and made it all the way to the preliminary final before being defeated by arch rivals the Sydney Roosters 12-4.

He capped a stellar season by earning selection in the Australian Kangaroos team as starting hooker for Test matches against New Zealand and Tonga.

On 5 December Cook signed a five-year deal worth $4.5 million to stay with Souths until the end of 2023.

2019
After a good start to the 2019 NRL season for Souths, Cook was selected to play for New South Wales in the 2019 State of Origin series.  In the series decider at ANZ Stadium, Cook scored a brilliant individual try as New South Wales defeated Queensland 26-20 winning their second series in a row.  The match was won in the last 20 seconds courtesy of a try scored by James Tedesco.

Cook made a total of 26 appearances for Souths in the 2019 NRL season as the club finished third on the table and qualified for the finals.  Cook played in all three of the club's finals games as they reached the preliminary final against the Canberra Raiders.  Cook had a game to forget in the preliminary final which culminated when he missed a one on one tackle with Canberra forward Josh Papalii who scored under the posts to win the match 16-10. On 7 October, Cook was named in the Australian side for the Oceania Cup fixtures.

2020
In round 10 of the 2020 NRL season, Cook scored two tries as Souths lost the match 20-18 against Newcastle at Bankwest Stadium.

Cook played 23 games for South Sydney in the 2020 NRL season.  Cook played in the club's third straight preliminary final but the club once again fell short of a grand final appearance losing to Penrith 20-16.

Cook was again selected to play for New South Wales in the 2020 State of Origin series. In game 1 of the series he scored the opening try, but NSW lost the match 18-14. He played all three games in the series as New South Wales suffered a shock 2-1 series defeat.

2021
On 30 May, Cook was selected for game one of the 2021 State of Origin series.  Cook played in all three games as New South Wales won the series 2-1.

Cook played a total of 24 games for South Sydney in the 2021 NRL season including the club's 2021 NRL Grand Final defeat against Penrith.

2022
In round 6 of the 2022 NRL season, Cook scored his first career hat-trick in South Sydney's 36-16 victory over Canterbury.
On 29 May, Cook was selected by New South Wales to play in game one of the 2022 State of Origin series.  Cook played in all three games as New South Wales lost the series 2-1
Cook played 23 games for South Sydney in the 2022 NRL season including all three of the clubs finals matches as they reached the preliminary final for a fifth straight season.  Souths would lose in the preliminary final to eventual premiers Penrith 32-12.

References

External links
South Sydney Rabbitohs profile
Canterbury-Bankstown Bulldogs profile

1991 births
People from the Sutherland Shire
Rugby league players from Sydney
NRL All Stars players
Country New South Wales Origin rugby league team players
New South Wales Rugby League State of Origin players
St. George Illawarra Dragons players
Canterbury-Bankstown Bulldogs players
South Sydney Rabbitohs players
Illawarra Cutters players
North Sydney Bears NSW Cup players
Rugby league hookers
Rugby league halfbacks
Living people
Australia national rugby league team players